James Shelton Voss (born March 3, 1949) is a retired United States Army colonel and NASA astronaut. During his time with NASA, Voss flew in space five times on board the Space Shuttle and International Space Station. He also served as deputy of Flight Operations for the Space Station Program Mission Integration and Operations Office. While participating in ISS Expedition 2, he and Susan Helms conducted an 8-hour and 56 minute spacewalk, the longest to date.

He is a Scholar in Residence at the University of Colorado.

Early life and education

Voss was born on March 3, 1949, in Cordova, Alabama, and was raised by his grandparents in Opelika, Alabama. As a child he read a lot of science fiction with an emphasis on spaceflight. While attending Opelika High School he participated in wrestling, track and field, and football.

After graduating high school, Voss attended Auburn University. As an undergraduate, he wrestled on the Auburn University wrestling team.  He was also a member of Beta Zeta chapter of the Theta Xi fraternity, where he served as Chapter President for the school year 1970–71. While at Auburn, Voss also participated in Army ROTC. After graduating with a Bachelor of Science degree in Aerospace Engineering in 1972 he was commissioned as a second lieutenant in the U.S. Army. Under the Army Graduate Fellowship Program, Voss was allowed to defer his entry into active duty in order to attend the University of Colorado. He graduated in 1974 with a Master of Science degree in Aerospace Engineering Sciences.

Army career
After receiving his master's degree, Voss attended the Infantry Basic Course in 1974 where he was listed as a Distinguished Graduate. He then attended Airborne School and Ranger School, at the latter he was awarded the Honor Graduate and Leadership Award. Voss was then stationed with the 2nd Battalion, 48th Infantry Regiment in West Germany serving as a platoon leader, intelligence staff officer, and C company commander. He returned to the United States and attended the Infantry Officer Advanced Course in 1979, making the Commandant's List. He taught in the Department of Mechanics at the United States Military Academy at West Point. While at West Point, Voss participated in a NASA Summer Faculty Research Fellowship and received the William P. Clements Jr. Award for Excellence in Education as the outstanding professor at the Academy. Voss then attended the U.S. Naval Test Pilot School, graduating with the Outstanding Student Award in 1983. He then attended the Armed Forces Staff College. Voss was subsequently assigned as a Flight Test Engineer/Research and Development Coordinator with the U.S. Army Aviation Engineering Flight Activity. He participated in major flight test programs before being assigned to NASA. At NASA, Voss worked at the Johnson Space Center from November 1984 to June 1987. He worked as a Vehicle Integration Test Engineer supporting the STS-51-D, STS-51-F, STS-61-C, and STS-51-L missions. After the Challenger accident, Voss participated in the investigation. He was selected by NASA as an astronaut candidate in June 1987.

Astronaut career
Selected as an astronaut candidate by NASA in June 1987, Voss completed a one-year training and evaluation program in August 1988, which qualified him for assignment as a mission specialist on Space Shuttle flights. He has worked as a flight crew representative in the area of Shuttle safety, as a CAPCOM, providing a communications interface between ground controllers and flight crews during simulations and Shuttle flights, and as the Astronaut Office Training Officer. After his third spaceflight, Voss spent two years training at the Yuri Gagarin Cosmonaut Training Center in Star City, Russia. He served as a backup to Michael Foale on the STS-84/Mir 23/Mir 24/STS-86 mission and to Andrew Thomas for the STS-89/Mir 24/Mir 25/STS-91 mission. After his fifth flight, Voss served as the Deputy for Flight Operations in the Space Station Program Mission Integration and Operations Office.

Spaceflight experience

STS-44
Voss was a mission specialist on board Space Shuttle Atlantis during STS-44 from November 24 - December 1, 1991. The mission's primary objective was the deployment of a Defense Support Program satellite with an Inertial Upper Stage booster rocket. The crew also conducted two Military Man in Space experiments, three radiation monitoring experiments, and numerous medical tests to support longer duration spaceflight. The mission orbited the Earth 110 times before returning to Edwards Air Force Base in California.

STS-53

From December 2–9, 1992, Voss flew as a mission specialist on STS-53. The 171 orbit flight of the Space Shuttle Discovery deployed a classified Department of Defense payload. The satellite was the second launch of a Satellite Data System-2 military communications satellite.

STS-69
During STS-69, Voss was a mission specialist and payload commander on board Space Shuttle Endeavour. The flight, which orbited the Earth 171 times from September 7–18, 1995, successfully deployed a SPARTAN satellite and the Wake Shield Facility. Also on board was the International Extreme Ultraviolet Hitchhiker Payload as well as various medical experiments. Voss and Michael Gernhardt performed a six-hour spacewalk in order to test space suit modifications and to evaluate tools and procedures for future use on the International Space Station.

STS-101
Voss was a mission specialist on board Space Shuttle Atlantis on STS-101. The Shuttle visited the then-unmanned International Space Station and delivered over 3,000 pounds of equipment and supplies. The crew also repaired the Station's electrical and environmental control systems. At the time of the flight Jim was already assigned to fly on Expedition 2. His crewmates Yuri Usachev and Susan Helms flew with him on Atlantis in order to gain experience for their future long-duration stay. Jim and Jeff Williams conducted a six-hour spacewalk to finish installation of a Russian crane, replace a faulty antenna, and install handrails on the outside of the station.

STS-102
Voss and his Expedition 2 crewmates launched as Mission Specialists March 8, 2001, on board Space Shuttle Discovery during the STS-102 mission. The primary objectives of the flight were to rotate crew members and to resupply the station using the Multi-Purpose Logistics Module. Voss participated in one of the missions two spacewalks, along with Susan Helms, to prepare a Pressurized Mating Adapter for relocation. The spacewalk set a record of 8 hours 56 minutes duration.

Expedition 2

Voss, Susan Helms, and Yuri Usachev spent 163 days aboard the International Space Station conducting 18 scientific experiments, maintenance, and outfitting. During the flight, Jim (who was a Flight Engineer) was the first person to operate the Space Station Robotic Manipulator System (Canadarm2). He also participated in a 19-minute EVA, in which Voss and Usachev prepared a docking probe for the arrival of the Pirs Docking Compartment. During Jims stay on the ISS, the space station was visited by two unmanned cargo vehicles, the Soyuz TM-32 taxi mission, as well as two Space Shuttles (STS-100 and STS-104). Voss was also on board to witness the arrival of the Quest Airlock. He was one of the cinematographers and featured astronauts of the first 3D film shot in space, Space Station 3D. The film was released in theaters in 2002 and on DVD in 2005.

STS-105
Voss returned home from his fifth spaceflight as a mission specialist on board the Space Shuttle Discovery on August 20, 2001 (STS-105). The mission saw a crew rotation, two spacewalks, and another flight of the MPLM.

Post-NASA career
After retiring from NASA in 2003, Voss became Associate Dean of Engineering for External Affairs at Auburn University, assisting with student projects and development for the College and teaching a class in Aerospace Engineering on human spacecraft design. While at Auburn he led a team of twelve aerospace engineering seniors and one graduate research assistant in the development of a crew seat prototype for space startup Transformational Space Corporation , or t/Space. In 2005, Voss became VP of Space Exploration Systems for t/Space.In November 2007 Voss left t/Space to become the Vice President of Engineering at SpaceDev.  After SpaceDev was acquired by Sierra Nevada Corporation he became Sierra Nevada Corporation's director of advanced programs and, then VP of Space Exploration Systems and program executive on the Dream Chaser spaceplane. In August 2009 Voss began teaching as a Scholar in Residence at the University of Colorado at Boulder  teaching a class on human spaceflight.

He retired from SNC in July 2013 and continues to teach human spaceflight classes at the University of Colorado. Voss is a member of the NASA Advisory Council and on the Board of Directors of the National Space Biomedical Research Institute.

Awards and decorations

Voss has also been awarded: 
 University of Colorado Distinguished Engineering Alumni Award (2002)
 Alabama Engineering Hall of Fame (2001)
 Russian Spaceflight Medal of Achievement
 American Institute of Aeronautics and Astronautics Associate Fellow 
 Auburn University Distinguished Auburn Engineer 
 Most Outstanding Faculty Member, Aerospace Engineering Dept, Auburn University 
 University of Colorado Distinguished Engineering Alumni Award
 National Aeronautic Association Gagarin Gold Medal
 Alabama Aviation Hall of Fame

References

Voss bio on Transformational Space Corporation Web site 
Space Station 3D Web site
Presentation on Space Station 3D, James Voss, International Space Development Conference (ISDC) 2005, May 21, 2005
"CXV Crew Seat Concept," Transformational Space Corporation display at ISDC 2005, May 19-May 22, 2005

1949 births
Living people
United States Army astronauts
Crew members of the International Space Station
People from Opelika, Alabama
Auburn Tigers wrestlers
United States Naval Test Pilot School alumni
Joint Forces Staff College alumni
University of Colorado alumni
United States Military Academy faculty
United States Army colonels
American test pilots
21st-century American engineers
Recipients of the Distinguished Service Medal (US Army)
Recipients of the Defense Superior Service Medal
Recipients of the NASA Distinguished Service Medal
Recipients of the NASA Exceptional Service Medal
People from Cordova, Alabama
Space Shuttle program astronauts
Spacewalkers